Malek Samih Yousef Shalabiya (born 20 February 1988) is a Jordanian footballer who plays as a goalkeeper for Al-Ramtha and the Jordan national team.

Club career
Shalabiya joined Al-Jazeera in June 2014 on a two-year contract; the stay only lasted three months, as he moved to Al-Hussein in September.

Two years later, Shalabiya transferred to Shabab Al-Ordon, before joining Al-Ahli in January 2017. In the summer, Shalabiya joined Al-Wehdat.

On 20 December 2021, Shalabiya joined Saudi Arabian club Al-Kholood on a six-month deal. On 20 July 2022, Shalabiya joined Al-Ramtha on a free transfer.

International career
Shalabiya made his senior international debut for the Jordan national team on 28 January 2022, starting in a 3–1 friendly win against New Zealand.

Honours
 Jordan Premier League: 2008–09, 2010–11, 2013–14
 Jordan FA Cup: 2008–09, 2009–10, 2010–11, 2013–14
 Jordan FA Shield: 2008, 2010
 Jordan Super Cup: 2008, 2009, 2010, 2011

References

External links
 
 
 

1988 births
Living people
Sportspeople from Amman
Jordanian footballers
Association football goalkeepers
Al-Wehdat SC players
Al-Jazeera (Jordan) players
Al-Hussein SC (Irbid) players
Shabab Al-Ordon Club players
Al-Ahli SC (Amman) players
Al-Yarmouk FC (Jordan) players
Al-Ramtha SC players
Al-Kholood Club players
Jordanian Pro League players
Saudi First Division League players
Jordan international footballers
Jordanian expatriate footballers
Jordanian expatriate sportspeople in Saudi Arabia
Expatriate footballers in Saudi Arabia